Maken may refer to:

 Maken, West Virginia, a settlement in the US
 Maken X, a 1999 video game
 Makens, fictional entities in the Maken-ki! manga series
 Ajay Maken (born 1964)
 Lalit Maken (1951–1985)
Shikha Maken, director of Bachelor Girls

See also 
 Macken (disambiguation)
 Mekan (disambiguation)
 Makan (disambiguation)
 Maqên County, in China